The Ottoman–Hotaki War of 1726–1727 was a conflict fought between the Ottoman Empire and the Hotak dynasty, over control of all western and northwestern parts of Iran.

Background

The Hotaki dynasty was founded in 1709 by the Ghilzais of Kandahar who led a successful revolution against their Safavid suzerains. They had gained control over parts of current Afghanistan and Iran from 1722 to 1729, after having taken advantage of the heavily declining, plagued by civil strife and royal intrigues, Safavid dynasty of Iran . The Safavids, once the arch enemy and most powerful opponent of the Ottomans, had been severely declining since the late 17th century due to incompetent rulers and civil strife.

During the decline of the Safavid state, the Ottoman and Russian empires had taken advantage of Iran's decadence to annex much of western Iran. During the Afghan invasion, the Russians under Peter I immediately launched a campaign against Iran, capturing and securing parts of Dagestan, Azerbaijan, and Gilan and having a claim on Astarabad due to the treaty of St. Petersburg. The Russian occupation sparked tensions between the Ottoman and Russian empires, as the Ottomans did not want the Russians to proceed into the now-Turkish province of Shirvan governed by Hajji Dawud. However, through negotiations between the two tensions were reduced and in June 1724 the Treaty of Constantinople was signed. Russia and the Ottomans agreed to divide the regions captured from Iran.

The Ottomans proceeded to launch a campaign against the Safavids in the northwest. In 1723 Ibrahim Pasha captured the city of Tiflis, although guerilla resistance in the province continued for quite some time. In the late spring of 1724, Ahmad Pasha marched towards the city of Erevan, and eventually capturing it on September 28, 1724. In March 1724 Ottoman forces besieged Khoy, and the fortress fell on May 12. In August 1724 Ottoman forces besieged Tabriz but were forced to retreat to Tasuj on September 30. However, Ottoman forces were reinforced and eventually were able to capture Tabriz in August 1725. Soon after, the rest of Azerbaijan and the towns of Ganja and Ardabil came under Ottoman suzerainty.

Ottoman-Afghan Diplomacy 
By early 1726, the Ottoman diplomatic and military initiatives were at their peak. They had successfully established their administration in the occupied regions, and expanded beyond the lands given to them in the 1724 treaty. However, the Ottomans would soon be confronted with a diplomatic enigma from the Hotaks. The Afghans sent an envoy by the name of Haji 'Abd al-'Aziz, a scholar from Mecca, to Istanbul and he arrived there on January 20, 1726. Despite the acceptance of this mission violating the 1724 treaty (as the Ottomans were not supposed to recognize the Afghan government or give them aid), Ibrahim Pasha hoped that the Afghans would pledge allegiance to the Ottoman sultan due to the unstable nature of the regime and give them indirect control over the rest of the country. However, he was to be disappointed for Shah Ashraf did not recognize the Ottoman occupation of western Iran and wanted those territories returned. In addition to this, he wanted to be recognized as the Sunni caliph in his own domains.

War 
Ashraf, posing as the rightful ruler (Shah) of Persia, demanded restitution of all the annexed territories. The Ottomans took offense at this perceived arrogance, and proceeded to sever relations with the Afghans and open hostilities in the spring of 1726. Since one of the Ottoman's declared war aims was to restore the Safavids as a client dynasty, Ashraf's first response was to put Sultan Husayn, who was living in captivity at Isfahan, to death in the autumn of 1726. Then, after strengthening the city's fortifications, Ashraf Hotaki marched out to meet Turkish troops and defeated them at Khoramabad, south of Hamadan, on 20 November 1726.

Preferring not to push onward, Ashraf opened negotiations which led to the signature of a peace treaty in October, 1727 (Treaty of Hamedan). The Afghans agreed with the treaty which confirmed Ottoman sovereignty over all the western and northwestern parts of Iran and, in return for Ashraf's abandonment of his territorial claims, gave him official recognition as Shah of Persia with rights of minting coins and sending annual pilgrimage caravans to Mecca.

Aftermath

The great majority of Iranians still rejected the Afghan regime as usurping since the day they invaded. The dynasty lived under great turmoil due to bloody succession feuds and resultant waves of internal revolts that made their hold on power tenuous and exhausted the strength of the Isfahan-based central government. That paved way for the rise of the Iranian military general Nader Shah and subsequently the continued wars of the Persian Empire with their Ottoman arch rivals.

See also
 Treaty of Constantinople (1724) – treaty between the Ottoman and the Russian Empire, dividing large portions of the territory of Persia between them, in time of decline of the Safavid Empire.

References

Sources

 
 
 
 
 
 
 

1720s conflicts
Wars involving Afghanistan
1720s in Iran
1720s in the Ottoman Empire
1722 in the Ottoman Empire
1727 in the Ottoman Empire
1722 in Iran
1727 in Iran